3 Train may refer to:
3 (New York City Subway service)
Paris Métro Line 3
Line 3 (Beijing Subway)
Line 3 (Shanghai Metro)

See also
Line 3 (disambiguation)